Un Pokito de Rocanrol is the third studio album released by Spanish singer-songwriter Bebe, released on February 6, 2012.

Reception
Un Pokito de Rocanrol received a nomination for the Latin Grammy Awards of 2012: Album of the Year. Moreover, her fourth single Mi Guapo was nominated for a Best Alternative Song.

Track listing
 ABC  - 05:42
 Adiós  - 03:45
 Me pintaré  - 04:37
 Sabrás  - 04:41
 Compra/Paga  - 03:28
 Mi guapo  - 05:01
 K.I.E.R.E.M.E.  - 02:58
 Der pelo  - 02:51
 Qué carajo  - 03:20
 Tilín  - 03:10
 Yo fumo  - 03:24

Singles

References

2012 albums
Bebe (singer) albums
Spanish-language albums